Mohammadabad-e Seyyed Nezam (also Romanized as Moḩammadābād-e Seyyed Neẓām; also known as Moḩammadābād-e Seyyed Neẓāmī) is a village in Kork and Nartich Rural District, in the Central District of Bam County, Kerman Province, Iran. At the 2006 census, its population was 16, in 5 families.

References 

Populated places in Bam County